Solh (or variants as-Solh, al-Solh, el-Solh) is an Arabic surname, mostly from Lebanon. 

Notable people with the name Solh and its variants include:

Riad Al Solh (1894–1951), Lebanese politician, former Prime Minister, the first prime minister of Lebanon after the country's independence
Sami as-Solh (1887–1968), Lebanese politician, former Prime Minister
Takieddin el-Solh (1908–1988), Lebanese politician, former Prime Minister
Rachid Solh (1926–2014), Lebanese politician, former Prime Minister
Leila Al Solh (born 1946), vice president of Alwaleed bin Talal Humanitarian Foundation and a former Lebanese minister of industry
Kazem El-Solh (1904–1976), Lebanese politician, a diplomat 
Mounira Solh (1911–2010), Lebanese pioneer advocate for the rights of women and people with disabilities
Sana Solh (1939–2019), Lebanese human rights activist 
Waheed el Solh (1901–1958), Lebanese politician
Raghid El-Solh (1942–2017), Lebanese writer and researcher 
Mahmoud Solh, Lebanese agricultural economist and genetic scientist

See also
Sulh, also solh, Arabic word which means peace as opposed to war. It is derived from the same root as Arabic word musalaha meaning reconciliation.[1] In Islamic Law it means an amicable settlement.
Solh Kabul F.C., football team in Afghanistan

Arabic-language surnames